June Clark may refer to:

 June Clark (nurse) (born 1941), British nurse, educator, and academic
 June Clark (artist) (born 1941), Canadian artist
 June Clark (musician) (1900–1963), American jazz trumpeter and cornetist
 June Clark (bowls) (born 1939), Australian Paralympic lawn bowls player